Crash Goes the Hash is a 1944 short subject directed by Jules White starring American slapstick comedy team The Three Stooges (Moe Howard, Larry Fine and Curly Howard). It is the 77th entry in the series released by Columbia Pictures starring the comedians, who appeared in 190 shorts at the studio between 1934 and 1959.

Plot
Fuller Bull (Vernon Dent), the head of the ailing Daily News, confronts the reporters he hired for not getting him a story to keep up with a competing newspaper called the Daily Star Press. Bull catches three shirtmen (the Stooges) outside; thinking they are reporters from the Daily Star Press, he immediately hires them to get a picture of visiting Prince Shaam of Ubeedarn (Dick Curtis). Word has it that Shaam has plans to marry local wealthy socialite Mrs. Van Bustle (Symona Boniface). The trio disguise themselves as servants and work their way into a party being held at Mrs. Van Bustle's home in the honor of the prince.

The Stooges all but sabotage the festivity by serving hors d'œuvres consisting of peas and dog biscuits (canapés/can-of-peas), along with a turkey stuffed with a live parrot. The prince leaves in disgust, with the majordomo, Flint (Bud Jamison, in his final appearance with the team) following close behind. Undaunted, the Stooges manage to expose both the prince and his majordomo as crooks who were planning to rob the house.

The next day, the Stooges tell Bull that the man claiming to be Prince Shaam is not a prince, but a crook, and they had both him and Flint arrested. As a result of their findings, Bull becomes overwhelmed with joy, and tells the people printing the paper to stop the presses for an extra. He gives the boys a large bonus, and Mrs. Van Bustle thanks the boys for saving her from being robbed by Shaam by deciding to marry Curly.

Cast

Credited

Production notes
Crash Goes the Hash was filmed October 11–13, 1943. It would be supporting actor Bud Jamison's final appearance in a Stooge film. A Type 2 diabetic in his later years, Jamison appeared in 16 more films before his untimely death in September 1944. A devout Christian Scientist, he died on September 30, 1944 at age 50 after refusing treatment for kidney cancer. Its plainly visible to see that Curly is wearing odd socks in the first part of the film.

At one point, Jamison gently breaks the fourth wall by comparing the boys to "The Three Stooges," to which they naturally take offense.

The parrot's "Jeepers creepers! What a night!" exclamation combines the 1930s slang euphemism from "Jesus Christ" (made into the Johnny Mercer 1938 song "Jeepers Creepers, Where'd You Get Those Peepers?") and the parrot's "What a night!' from the Stooges' 1936 entry Disorder in the Court.

Even though the story and screenplay is credited to Felix Adler, this film borrows considerable dialogue, situations, and even shot set-ups from the 1937 Columbia Short New News, starring Monte Collins and Tom Kennedy, which was written by Al Giebler, Elwood Ullman and Searle Kramer.

Curly Howard fades
The Stooges made many public appearances during the height of World War II in support of the war effort. The demands of the heavy touring took its toll on Curly in particular, whose timing and energy began to deteriorate. In Crash Goes the Hash, Curly's speech is slightly slower and his falsetto had begun to lose its crisp high pitch. The dialogue spoken at the lemonade table where he covertly tells Larry to take a picture of Prince Shaam features Curly talking in his normal speaking voice, which is noticeably deeper than Moe's or Larry's.

See also
List of American films of 1944

References

External links
 
 
Crash Goes the Hash at threestooges.net

1944 films
The Three Stooges films
1940s English-language films
Columbia Pictures short films
American black-and-white films
Films directed by Jules White
1944 comedy films
American comedy short films
1944 short films
1940s American films